The Early Germans is a book by archaeologist Malcolm Todd on the history and culture of the early Germanic peoples. It was published by Blackwell in 1992. The books was published as part of The Peoples of Europe series. A second revised edition was published in 2004. Translations have been published in numerous languages, including Italian, Czech, German and Russian.

See also 

 Altgermanische Religionsgeschichte
 Early Germanic Literature and Culture
 Germanische Altertumskunde Online
 Language and history in the early Germanic world

Sources

External links
 Publisher's website 

1992 non-fiction books
Germanic studies